The 2007–08 Oklahoma Sooners men's basketball team represented the University of Oklahoma in the 2007–08 NCAA Division I men's basketball season. The head coach was Jeff Capel, who was in his second year with the team. The team played its home games in the Lloyd Noble Center in Norman, Oklahoma and was a member of the Big 12 Conference.

References

Oklahoma Sooners men's basketball seasons
Oklahoma
Oklahoma